Engelbert Linder (born 18 July 1962) is an Austrian ice hockey player. He competed in the men's tournaments at the 1994 Winter Olympics and the 1998 Winter Olympics.

References

1962 births
Living people
Olympic ice hockey players of Austria
Ice hockey players at the 1994 Winter Olympics
Ice hockey players at the 1998 Winter Olympics
Sportspeople from Villach
EC VSV players
Graz 99ers players